Looney Tunes: Acme Arsenal is an action-adventure game developed for the Wii, Xbox 360 and PlayStation 2.  A companion game for the Nintendo DS, Looney Tunes: Duck Amuck, was also simultaneously released.

Gameplay 
The game features both single player and two-player cooperative play. Gameplay is similar to many platform games including combat, puzzle solving and vehicle-based levels. The game also features an "Acme Battle Mode". In this mode, two players fight each other as different characters.

Reception 

The game received "generally unfavorable" reviews, according to video game review score aggregator Metacritic.

References

External links 
 Official website
 

2007 video games
Wii games
Xbox 360 games
Video games based on Looney Tunes
PlayStation 2 games
Warner Bros. video games
Video games about time travel
Video games developed in Australia
Cooperative video games
Video games using Havok
Gamebryo games
3D platform games
Cartoon Network video games
Multiplayer and single-player video games